Charles Frederick Frazier Mackenzie (1825–62) was a Church of England Bishop of Central Africa.  He is commemorated in some Anglican Church Calendars.

Life
He was born at Portmore, Peeblesshire, Scotland, the ninth son of Colin Mackenzie and Elizabeth Forbes. Anne Mackenzie, editor of all 31 years of The Net Cast in Many Waters: Sketches from the Life of Missionaries, London, 1866–1896, was his unmarried sister.  He was educated at Bishop Wearmouth school and Edinburgh Academy, and entered St John's College, Cambridge in 1844. He migrated to Caius College, where he graduated B. A. as Second Wrangler in 1848, and became a Fellow of Caius. 

He was ordained as a priest in 1852 and served as curate of Haslingfield near Cambridge, 1851–4. In 1855, he went to Natal with Bishop Colenso and served as Archdeacon of Natal. They worked among the English settlers till 1859 when he returned to England briefly to raise support for more direct missionary work.  In 1860, Mackenzie became head of the Universities' Mission to Central Africa and he was consecrated bishop in St George's Cathedral, Cape Town, on 1 January 1861. Following David Livingstone's request to Cambridge, Mackenzie took on the position of being the first missionary bishop in Nyasaland (now Malawi); he was called at the time (Missionary) Bishop in (or of) Central Africa.

Moving from Cape Town, Mackenzie sailed with Livingstone up the Zambezi and Shire rivers with a small group, including Horace Waller, to start work. He arrived at Chibisa's village in June 1861 with the goal to establish a mission station at Magomero, near Zomba, while Livingstone continued with his expedition. Mackenzie directly opposed the slave trade causing the enmity of the Yao. He worked among the people of the Manganja country until January 1862 when he went on a supplies trip together with a few members of his party. The boat they were travelling on sank and as their medical supplies were lost, Mackenzie's malaria could not be treated. He died of Blackwater fever on 31 January 1862 on an island in the Shire River, and was buried at Chiromo. Livingstone erected a cross over his grave a year later.

An International school in Lilongwe, the capital of Malawi, is named after him.

See also
Church of the Province of Central Africa

References

Citations

Sources

Further reading

1825 births
1862 deaths
19th-century Christian saints
Anglican missionaries in Malawi
Anglican missionaries in South Africa
Anglican saints
Anglican bishops in Central Africa
Deaths from malaria
Fellows of Gonville and Caius College, Cambridge
Scottish Anglican missionaries
Scottish saints
Second Wranglers